Renaissance Weekend is an invite-only American retreat for leaders in business and finance, government, the media, religion, medicine, science, technology, and the arts. Conversations are off-the-record and subject matter ranges widely, tending to focus heavily on policy and business issues.

History
Founded in 1980 on Hilton Head Island, South Carolina, by Linda LeSourd Lader and her husband Philip Lader, the former U.S. Ambassador to the Court of St. James's, Renaissance Weekends, now held in several locations each year, are structured to encourage the transcendence of political, economic, and religious differences by bringing together distinguished participants from a wide range of fields, including CEOs, venture capitalists and entrepreneurs, Nobel Laureates and Pulitzer Prize-winners, artists and scientists, astronauts and Olympians, judges, diplomats and Presidents, Prime Ministers, professors and priests, Republicans, Democrats and Independents. The Weekends are geared towards the establishment of an environment free of partisanship and commercialism, where "civility prevails." Membership is by invitation only.

Sixty families pioneered the Laders' 1980 New Year's house party. The result has been a cross-generational "continuing conversation" of individuals with broadly divergent perspectives, no political agenda, but a legacy of ideas and friendships.

Objectives
The mission is "To build bridges among innovative leaders with exceptionally diverse perspectives." Each Renaissance Weekend seeks to build bridges across traditional divides of professions, politics, geography, age, religions, philosophies, religion, and race. For over 25 years, these family retreats' objective has been to encourage personal and national renewal.

Through hundreds of panels, seminars and workshops each Weekend, participants themselves address such public policy and personal concerns as "America's Responsibility to the World," "Investment Perspectives," "How the Media has Covered the War Against Terrorism," "Corporate Governance After Enron," "Beating Cancer," "My Family's Legacies for Life," and "Christianity, Judaism & Islam - Eternal Truths & Current Myths."

Attendees 
"More than 1,000 participants will take part in 500 lectures, seminars, discussions and performances during the four-day event." The Clinton family attended Renaissance Weekend for 13 years. Some former attendees of Renaissance Weekend, listed by the year(s) of attendance have included;

Politicians 

 1992, 1993, 1995, 1997 – Bill Clinton, former 42nd US President.
 1992, 1993, 1995, 1997 – Hillary Clinton, former first lady and U.S. Senator.
 1993 – Harry Blackmun, US supreme court justice.
 1993 – Ernest Hollings, U.S. Senator.
 1993 – Charles Robb, U.S. Senator.
 1993 – Barbara Mikulski, U.S. Senator.
 2010 – Dirk Kempthorne, former Bush administration Interior Secretary, U.S. Senator and Idaho Governor.
 2010 – Bruce Babbitt, former Clinton administration Interior Secretary and Arizona Governor.
 2010 – Gil Kerlikowske, Obama administration commissioner of U.S. Customs and Border Protection and former director of the Office of National Drug Control Policy.
 2010 – Richard Riley, former Clinton administration US Secretary of Education and South Carolina Governor.
 2015 – Millie Hallow, National Rifle Association (NRA) executive.

Entertainment 

 1993, 1995 – Mary Chapin Carpenter, singer and songwriter
 2010, 2015 – Gail Sheehy, author of Passages.
 2010, 2013, 2015 – Dr. Ruth Westheimer (Dr. Ruth), sex therapist and author.
 2010 – Kevin Bleyer, writer for the Daily Show.
 2010 – Scott Simon, NPR radio host and journalist.
 2013 – Estelle Parsons, actress.
 2013 – Kay Koplovitz, founder of USA Network TV channel.

News 

 1992, 1993, 1995, 1997 – Chelsea Clinton, former special correspondent for NBC News.
 1993 – Wolf Blitzer, journalist and TV news anchor for CNN.
 1993 – Peter Arnett, journalist and TV news anchor for CNN.
 1993 – Andrea Mitchell, TV news anchor for NBC.
 1993 – Edwin Yoder, Pulitzer Prize winning journalist.
 1993 – Joe Klein, journalist and columnist.
 1993 – Howard Fineman, journalist and columnist.
 2010 – Alex Jones, Pulitzer Prize winning journalist.
 2010 – Esther Dyson, journalist and angel investor in technology and healthcare.
 2010  – Jennifer 8 Lee, journalist and author.

Military and intelligence 
 1993 – Elmo Zumwalt, former admiral of the US Navy.
 2010 – Hank Crumpler, former top Afghanistan CIA agent and U.S. ambassador for counter-terrorism.
 2010 – Valerie Plame, former CIA officer.
 2013 – Stanley A. McChrystal, retired US Army General.

Science and technology 

 2010, 2015 – William Phillips, physics nobel laureate.
 2010 – Mark Kelly, NASA space shuttle Commander.
 2010 –  Joan Higginbotham, former NASA astronaut.
 2010 – Flossie Wong-Stahl, virologist and molecular biologist, the first to discover HIV.
 2010 – Peter Norton, programmer and founder of Norton Utilities.

Education 
 2010 – Gordon Gee, President of West Virginia University and former President of Ohio State University.
 2010 – Lawrence Bacow, lawyer and economist, former President of Tufts University., President of Harvard University.
 2010 – Howard Gardner, Harvard educator, director of Harvard Project Zero and co-founder of the Good Project.
 2010 – Sherry Turkle, professor at Massachusetts Institute of Technology.

References

External links
 Renaissance Weekend Official Website
 New York Times Article about Renaissance weekend in 1993
 Washington Post article about Clintons' attendance driving up size of event
 South Carolina Local News Story on Annual New Year's meeting in 2010

Social events
Hilton Head Island, South Carolina
Events in South Carolina
1981 establishments in South Carolina